The Society of Medalists was established in 1930 in the United States to encourage the medallic work of superior sculptors, and to make their creations available to the public.  The Society of Medalists was the longest running art medal collector's organization in the United States and released 129 regular issues on a twice yearly basis from 1930 to 1995, as well as special issues marking the Society's 20th, 40th, and 50th anniversaries and the United States Bicentennial in 1976. Much of the inspiration for the Society came from the earlier Circle of Friends of the Medallion, which also issued medals on a semi-annual basis from 1908 to 1915. All issues of the Society were struck by the Medallic Art Company, originally located in New York City

Many of the early contributors to the Society of Medalists were prominent American sculptors of the first half of the 20th century. Lee Lawrie was well known for modernistic art-deco works like the Statue of Atlas in New York City and the Sower atop the Nebraska State Capitol, while artists like Lorado Taft represented a more classical ethos. Others concentrated more, although not exclusively, on medallic art, such as John Flanagan (designer of the Washington quarter dollar) and Laura Gardin Fraser. The artists who created the series represented a wide variety of styles and expertise.

The Society of Medalists issues covered a wide variety of themes during its sixty-five years of existence. Because the artists were allowed to select their subject matter, many of the medals are topical. Those of the 1930s frequently serve as commentary on the experiences of the first World War, and anticipate the destruction of the second. Religion often serves as a theme, with interpretations of biblical scenes prevalent throughout all decades. Art, science, and nature also provided inspiration for artists and their medals'.

With two exceptions, all issues of the Society of Medalists were initially manufactured in bronze. Issues 28 and 29, created during World War II, were first produced in silver. During the 1970s the Society undertook a program to restrike its earlier issues in silver. The advent of a spike in silver prices late in the decade, coupled with a low level of demand for the new issues, led to the demise of the silver restrike program by the early 1980s.

The Society of Medalist represents an interesting and accessible collecting opportunity. All of the issues are available on the secondary market, with both specialized dealers and internet auction services serving as important sources. Collectors value the medals in their original boxes, complete with the descriptive pamphlets that accompanied them.

History
Although the official date of establishment was 1930, there was a public notice for the organization in the January 1929 edition of The Numismatist, the journal of the American Numismatic Association. The notice also stated that, "The Society of Medalists had its inception at the convention of the American Federation of Arts in Washington last May" (May 1928). The notice further stated, "The organization committee is composed of George D. Pratt, Robert W. DeForest and Alexander B. Trowbridge", however, later documents attributed the founding entirely to Pratt. Additionally, the notice discussed that, "Exceptionally accurate machinery makes it possible to strike medals to the quantity of 1,000 or more for very low cost."

In 2010 the American Numismatic Society published the authoritative reference and history of both the Circle of Friends of the Medallion and the Society of Medalists, American Art Medals, 1909-1995 by well known numismatic scholar David Thomason Alexander. In 2016, the Northwest Territorial Mint, parent company of the Medallic Art Company, declared bankruptcy and its assets were subsequently liquidated. In 2018 the American Numismatic Society acquired Medallic Art's archive of historic medals, including records, dies, and examples of the Society of Medalists.

References

External links

Websites
medallicartcollector.com: "Society of Medalists"
Medal Collectors of America: Society of Medalists Collector's Guide

Web Articles
Professional Coin Grading Service: Enduring Society of Medalists First Issue Continues to Attract Collectors by Fred Reed - September 9, 1999

 
Arts organizations established in 1930
1930 establishments in the United States
Exonumia